The West Harlem Art Fund, Inc. is a public art and media organization based in the City of New York, founded in 1998. Savona Bailey-McClain is its Executive Director and Chief Curator.

Scope of activities
The West Harlem Art Fund, Inc. provides exhibition opportunities to artists and creative professionals in public spaces located in Northern Manhattan. The organization is also involved in projects related to historical and cultural heritage and supports community involvement in local development. Its organizational symbol is the double crocodile from West Africa, which is ( one of the Adinkra symbols ). The term Funtunmmireku-Denkyemmirreku, which means unity in diversity, represents the organization's values.
The West Harlem Art Fund, Inc. offers various forms of public art, including traditional exhibitions, photo installations, windows, digital and live performances, which can be commissioned or through agency programs. The organization is committed to promoting art in public parks and open spaces throughout New York City. It also advocates for better maintenance, lighting, and landscaping for parks to local City and State officials.

History

The West Harlem Art Fund is an organization that has exhibited outdoor installations in various locations for many years. The organization's first installation, "Three Men Walking," was held in May 2003 and featured Kirsten Campbell's work, "Moving Beyond," in Historic St. Nicholas Park. Despite facing skepticism and negative stereotypes, the success of this exhibition helped the organization to produce more outdoor installations. Over time, the West Harlem Art Fund has exhibited in all four Historic Harlem Parks, smaller parks, lobby spaces, sidewalks, storefronts in Harlem, as well as in Times Square, DUMBO, Governor's Island, Queens, Bronx, and Lower Manhattan. Alongside these exhibitions, the organization has also produced concerts, historical re-enactments, theatrical and storytelling events. A diverse range of artists have been featured, including Barbara Siegel, Luisa Caldwell, Robert Hickman, Florencio Gelabert, Sandor Camille, Julio Valdez, Queen Esther, Jann Parker, Patrick Singh, Dianne Smith, Nora Mae Carmichael, Richard Gonzalez, Sai Morikawa, Scherezade Garcia, Iliana Emilia Garcia, Ellen Maynard, Kiki Smith, Vicki DaSilva, Kyuseok Oh, and Bentley Meeker.

Between 2005 and 2008, a project known as "Take Me to the River" was launched, with the goal of improving waterfront access and facilities for the West Harlem community along the Hudson River. The project was funded through the New York State Environmental Protection Fund, which was administered by the New York Department of State, Division of Coastal Resources, and the Office of the Manhattan Borough President. Phase I and II of the project raised a total of $550,000, which in turn led to an additional $40 million in funding from the City of New York for capital improvements that began in 2010. The improvements include new playing fields and picnic areas from 145th to 155th Streets, as well as a future public art walk.

During the fall of 2008, the West Harlem Art Fund collaborated with Vantage Properties to establish storefront installations and a temporary boutique in vacant commercial spaces along Broadway in West Harlem and Washington Heights. These installations provided a platform for emerging fashion designers to showcase their work for a limited period and brought a sense of hope to local community residents during a challenging period in the nation's history.

In 2009, the West Harlem Art Fund made a decision to further explore the concept of "pop-up" installations. The organization collaborated with Transportation Alternative for NYC Park(ING) Day and produced multiple installations in different areas of the city. Furthermore, the West Harlem Art Fund formed a partnership with the Humanities & Art Division at The City College of New York to co-sponsor public art installations on an annual basis at St. Nicholas Park, a historically significant location, starting in 2010.

In 2010, the West Harlem Art Fund, Inc. partnered with the MFA program at the City College of New York, the City University of New York to present the exhibition In Dialogue featuring the works of artists Marcie Revens and Scherezade Garcia in historic St. Nicholas Park. The organization also featured an installation called Ghost Net by the organization Trash Patch at the Tapestry Building in East Harlem during the summer. The timing of the Ghost Net installation was significant as it coincided with the discovery of an Atlantic trash patch and the BP Gulf oil spill off the coast of Louisiana. The Ghost Net installation offered the public an opportunity to envision what a real trash patch would look like underwater.

In March 2011, a public art exhibition was held in the heart of Times Square, featuring the Counting Sheep installation, created by Kyu Seok Oh. The West Harlem Art Fund, in partnership with the Times Square Alliance and the Armory Show, organized and presented the exhibition. Counting Sheep was the first outdoor paper sculpture installation in New York City and attracted a significant number of viewers and visitors between 45th and 46th Street and Broadway.

In 2012, an organization was chosen to create a public art installation for the Affordable Art Fair in Chelsea, which featured the work of Dominican artist Iliana Emilia Garcia. In 2013, the organization produced two shows in the Bronx at Bartow-Pell Mansion and at the Andrew Freedman Home on the Grand Concourse. Later that year, the organization collaborated with New York Restoration Project to produce the public art series Playlab, which was held in four gardens in East Harlem. In 2014, the organization curated The H in Harlem, an installation by premier lighting designer Bentley Meeker, and the intervention series Under the Viaduct, which included works by various artists such as Vicki DaSilva, Peter Rogina, Cynthia Rudin, Henry Gwiadzu, Jonas Nilsson, Eva Olson, Carlton Bright, Eileen Cohen, Lady K Fever, choreographer Ellen Maynard, and digital students from New York University's ITP Program and Columbia University Sound Art Program.

List of exhibitions

Counting Sheep 2011
Gumboot Juba 2011
Story Piles 2012
Brimming on the Edge 2013
The H in Harlem 2014
Under the Viaduct 2014
East River Flows 2014/2015

References

Additional references

External links
 

Arts organizations based in New York City
Public art in New York City
Harlem